Sir William Magnay, 1st Baronet (4 March 1795- 3 April 1871) was an English merchant who was Lord Mayor of London in 1843.

Magnay was the son of Christopher Magnay who was Lord Mayor of London from 1821 to 1822. He became a city of London merchant and was a member of the Worshipful Company of Stationers and Newspaper Makers of which company he was master from 1817 to 1818. In 1838 he was elected an alderman of the City of London for Vintry ward. He was Sheriff of London from 1841 to 1842.  In 1843, he was elected Lord Mayor of London. He was treasurer of the Honourable Artillery Company from  1843 to 1857.

Magnay was created Baronet of Postford House in the County of Surrey on 8 November 1844. He was a major in the HAC from 1845 to 1848.

Magnay died at the age of  76.

Magnay was the father of William who was a novelist.

Arms

References

1795 births
1871 deaths
Sheriffs of the City of London
19th-century lord mayors of London
19th-century English politicians
Baronets in the Baronetage of the United Kingdom